Kuyili is a rural locality (a selo) in Balkharsky Selsoviet, Akushinsky  District, Republic of Dagestan, Russia. The population was 157 as of 2010.

Geography 
Kuli is located 26 km northwest of Akusha (the district's administrative centre) by road. Balkar is the nearest rural locality.

References 

Rural localities in Akushinsky District